Lucrecia Guerrero is an American novelist and short story writer whose works include Chasing Shadows (2000) and Tree of Sighs (2010).

Biography
Guerrero spent her childhood years in Nogales, Arizona, and the border sense of that experience infuses her work.  Her characters inhabit two worlds—often literally and metaphorically:  their traditional Hispanic roots are often at war with the more transient values of the modern United States.  Her stories often focus on young people facing their own moments of transition.  Tree of Sighs has recently won the Christopher Isherwood Award.  Guerrero's work has brought her a solid core of admirers.

Guerrero currently resides near Chicago, where she writes and finds herself in frequent demand for teaching assignments at writers' conferences.  She holds an MFA from Spaulding University in Louisville.

References
Jayson Gonzales Sae-Saue, Border Fictions: Globalization, Empire, and Writing at the Boundaries of the United States. Oxford University Press.

21st-century American novelists
American women novelists
Living people
21st-century American women writers
Year of birth missing (living people)